Charly In-Albon (born 23 June 1957 in Brig, Switzerland) is a retired football defender.

During his club career, In-Albon played for FC Sion and Grasshoppers Zürich. He also represented the Switzerland national football team, making 40 appearances and scoring one goal. He then became a manager.

Honours
Grasshoppers
 Swiss Championship: 1981–82, 1982–83, 1983–84, 1989–90, 1990–91
 Swiss Cup: 1982–83, 1987–88, 1988–89, 1989–90
 Swiss Super Cup: 1989

References

External links
 
 

1957 births
Living people
Swiss men's footballers
Switzerland international footballers
Association football defenders
FC Sion players
Grasshopper Club Zürich players
Swiss football managers
FC Sion managers
FC Winterthur managers
People from Brig-Glis
Sportspeople from Valais